The CMLL International Gran Prix (2006) was a lucha libre, or professional wrestling, tournament produced and scripted by the Mexican professional wrestling promotion Consejo Mundial de Lucha Libre (CMLL; "World Wrestling Council" in Spanish) which took place on May 12, 2006 in Arena México, Mexico City, Mexico, CMLL's main venue. The 2006 International Gran Prix was the ninth time CMLL has held an International Gran Prix tournament since 1994. All International Gran Prix tournaments have been a one-night tournament, always as part of CMLL's Friday night CMLL Super Viernes shows.

The ninth International Gran Prix tournament featured a 16-man torneo cibernetico elimination match between a team representing Mexico (L.A. Park, Dos Caras Jr., Dr. Wagner Jr., Heavy Metal, Mr. Niebla, Héctor Garza, Olímpico and Último Guerrero) facing a team of "International" wrestlers, some who worked for CMLL at the time (Marco Corleone, Shigeo Okumura and Pierroth, a Japanese wrestlers who worked mainly in Mexico at the time (Hajime Ohara and Masada) and as well as three foreign born wrestlers that did not generally work in Mexico at the time (Katsushi Takemura, Milano Collection AT and Johnny Stamboli). The match came down to Último Guerrero and Johnny Stambol as the final two participants and saw Guerrero win the Gran Prix.

Production

Background
In 1994 the Mexican  professional wrestling promotion Consejo Mundial de Lucha Libre (CMLL) organized their first ever International Gran Prix tournament. The first tournament followed the standard "single elimination" format and featured sixteen wrestlers in total, eight representing Mexico and eight "international" wrestlers. In the end Mexican Rayo de Jalisco Jr. defeated King Haku in the finals to win the tournament. In 1995 CMLL brought the tournament back, creating an annual tournament held every year from 1995 through 1998 and then again in 2002, 2003 and finally from 2005 through 2008.

Storylines
The CMLL Gran Prix show  featured four professional wrestling matches scripted by CMLL with some wrestlers involved in scripted feuds. The wrestlers portray either heels (referred to as rudos in Mexico, those that play the part of the "bad guys") or faces (técnicos in Mexico, the "good guy" characters) as they perform.

Tournament

Tournament overview

Tournament show

References

2006 in professional wrestling
CMLL International Gran Prix
2006 in Mexico
May 2006 events in Mexico